David E. Stuart is an American anthropologist, and novelist, and Associate Provost Emeritus at University of New Mexico.

He graduated from West Virginia Wesleyan College, with a BA in Anthropology and Sociology in 1967, and from University of New Mexico with an MA in 1970 and PhD in 1972 in Anthropology.

He has conducted fieldwork in Alaska, Ecuador, Mexico, and the Southwest.
He teaches at University of New Mexico.
He is a Guggenheim Fellow.

Works
The magic of Bandelier, Ancient City Press, 1989,  

 
The Morganza, 1967: life in a legendary reform school, University of New Mexico Press, 2009,

Novels

Angel of Vilcabamba, University of New Mexico Press, 2009,

References

External links
"Featured Author: David E. Stuart", New Mexico Magazine, January 2010
Anasazi America website

American anthropologists
West Virginia Wesleyan College alumni
University of New Mexico alumni
University of New Mexico faculty
Living people
21st-century American novelists
American male novelists
21st-century American male writers
Year of birth missing (living people)